WVVR (100.3 FM, "The Beaver") is a radio station licensed to serve Hopkinsville, Kentucky.  The station is owned by the Five Star Media Group subsidiary of Saga Communications through licensee Saga Communications of Tuckessee, LLC.  It airs a country music format.

History

WVVR-FM went on the air in 1960 as WFOF-FM with several call sign changes through the years including WKSD-FM, WKOA-FM, WYKH-FM, WZZF-FM and WBVR-FM.  The station was purchased in 1977 by a group of Hopkinsville, Kentucky investors, with Hal King serving as the manager.  WKOA became WYKH – meaning "Your Kentucky Home" – which switched to a solid gold format in 1986 after John N. Hall III bought the station.  The next year the station became WQKS "Kiss FM" to reflect a new urban contemporary format.

Over time the station programmed beautiful music, stereo rock and contemporary hit radio.  The station, known as "K-100", became "Z-100" when the call letters changed to WZZF-FM in 1986.

The station was purchased by WRUS, INC., of Russellville, Kentucky (a division of Forever Broadcasting at the time). WZZF had been oldies but changed call letters to WVVR-FM when it joined with WMJM to pick up the former WBVR-FM country music format. WBVR-FM in Bowling Green-Russellville, KY was considered to be the "Original Beaver" radio station.  The Bowling Green station had far less power and was separate until its purchase later on after the "Beaver Branding" on WVVR.  The original station "Hook Phrase" was, "The Beaver 1-oh-1 FM!".  That changed after the tower and frequency were sold to Clear Channel in Nashville, Tennessee.  That is when the station adopted the equally powerful 100.3 FM frequency on the analog radio dial.  Afterward, the station was to be known as, "The Beaver 100.3!"  Some "hooks"  and "catchphrases" used by the station are/were, "Today's Best & MOST Country", "The Big Money-Beaver Country FM", and others.  In the late 1990s, the station moved out of its studios in Russellville, Kentucky and moved into new studios located in downtown Hopkinsville, Kentucky.  That all changed after the sell off from Forever Broadcasting when the station was then moved to a brand new location in Clarksville, Tennessee along with the other main Clarksville stations including WCVQ.

The station has been assigned these call letters by the Federal Communications Commission since July 1, 1994.

Former On Air Personalities include:
 Scooter Davis (d. 6/24/2016)
 Myla Thomas (currently mornings at WBVR in Bowling Green)
 Radio Rusty (Engineer for WFGS in Murray, KY)
 Steve Meredith aka "Roy Calhoun"
 Dylan "The Country Music Thriller" Miller
 Bailey Brooks (currently at WVVR as morning show co-host)
 Cheyenne Rivers
 Michael Davis (currently at WFGS in Murray, Kentucky)
 Marc Green
 Shannon Presley (currently at WBVR in Bowling Green)
 Alan Austin (currently at WBVR in Bowling Green)
 Tony Pratt aka "Kaptain Kicks" (currently at Nashville Country Television Network in Nashville, TN)

References

External links
WVVR official website

VVR
Radio stations established in 1960